Zak Delaney (born 10 January 2002) is an Irish professional footballer who currently plays as a defender for Inverness Caledonian Thistle in the Scottish Championship.

Club career 
Delaney spent his early youth career playing for Dublin sides, St Francis and St Patrick's Athletic before securing himself a move to EFL Championship side West Bromwich Albion.

Delaney never made an appearance for the first team at West Brom, as he spent his season out on loan to Bath City in the National League South, making his debut against Welling United.

In July 2022, Delaney went on trial at Inverness Caledonian Thistle, featuring in their 10–0 and 1–0 friendly wins over Clachnacuddin and Brora Rangers respectively, before signing for the club on 4 July.

References 

2002 births
Living people
Association footballers from Dublin (city)
Republic of Ireland association footballers
St Francis F.C. players
St Patrick's Athletic F.C. players
West Bromwich Albion F.C. players
Bath City F.C. players
Inverness Caledonian Thistle F.C. players